María Elena Carballo  (born 1958) is a Costa Rican politician. She was the Minister of Youth and Culture in Costa Rica  in 2006-2010.

References

1958 births
Date of birth missing (living people)
Living people
Government ministers of Costa Rica
Women government ministers of Costa Rica
Place of birth missing (living people)
21st-century Costa Rican women politicians